Iran participated in the 1990 Asian Games held in the capital city of Beijing. This country is ranked 5th with only 4 gold medals in this edition of the Asiad.

Medal summary

Medal table

Medalists

Results by event

Aquatics

Diving

Water polo 

Men

Athletics

Basketball 

Men

Boxing

Canoeing

Cycling

Fencing

Football 

Men

Judo

Shooting

Table tennis

Weightlifting

Men

Wrestling

Men's freestyle

Men's Greco-Roman

References

  Iran Olympic Committee - Asian Games Medalists
  Iran National Sports Organization - Asian Games Medalists

Nations at the 1990 Asian Games
1990
Asian Games